Turmeric tea is a kind of tea which originates from Okinawa, in southern Japan. Ukoncha is made of the rhizomes of turmeric.

Japanese drink brand Kirin produced "Kirin decomposition tea", a drink containing several teas including turmeric, in 2007.

References

Herbal tea
Japanese tea
Okinawan cuisine